Army CHESS (Computer Hardware Enterprise Software and Solutions) is the main provider of commercial enterprise information technology (IT) solutions, computer software, and hardware for the United States Army. CHESS allows authorized U.S. Army and other Federal Agency commissioners to easily procure a wide array of IT hardware and services through various contracting vessels. CHESS promotes competition amongst vendors in order to provide the best pricing as well as standardized hardware requirements mandated by the U.S. Army.

CHESS allows users to acquire an array of IT solutions through specific contract vehicles, this allows for a consolidated buy of IT products for the U.S. Army. In 2005, CHESS introduced the Consolidated Buy (CB) program, intended to allow the Army to offer IT solutions at a lower cost, through a large quantity purchasing strategy that allows end users to purchase CHESS-approved hardware and services at the same rate. In 2010, CHESS is reported to have helped the Army generate a cost avoidance of $724 million.

See also
Marine Corps Common Hardware Suite

References 

United States Army organization
United States defense procurement